Ivanhoe Bus Company was a bus operator in Melbourne, Australia. As a Melbourne bus company, it operated six bus routes under contract to the Government of Victoria. It was purchased by Ventura Bus Lines in June 2010.

History
In May 1952 Claude Morarty and William Molan purchased Heidelberg Motor Omnibus Company from Gordon Brown renaming the operation Ivanhoe Bus Company. In June 2010 the business was sold to Ventura Bus Lines.

Fleet
As at June 2010 the fleet consisted of 29 buses. Fleet livery was yellow with a green stripe.

References

External links

Bus companies of Victoria (Australia)
Bus transport in Melbourne
Transport companies established in 1956
Transport companies disestablished in 2010
Australian companies disestablished in 2010
Australian companies established in 1956